Thotapalli or Thota Palli is a village in Nagaram mandal, Guntur District, Andhra Pradesh, India. Located 16 km (9.94194 mi) away from the vidhana sabha constituency Repalle Town, Guntur District of the Indian state of Andhra Pradesh. It is a gramapanchayat of Nagaram mandal. It is situated on the plains at a distance of 15.9071 miles (25.6 km) of the Bay of Bengal. Thotapalli's starting name "Thutipilli". Founder Named as  "Thuttadu". Here surnames are "Anagani", Govathoti, etc.

References

Villages in Guntur district